Madagascar 3: Europe's Most Wanted is a 2012 American computer-animated circus comedy film produced by DreamWorks Animation and Pacific Data Images and distributed by Paramount Pictures. The film is the third installment of the Madagascar franchise, the sequel to Madagascar: Escape 2 Africa (2008), and was the first film in the series to be released in 3D. It was directed by Eric Darnell, Conrad Vernon, and Tom McGrath from a screenplay by Darnell and Noah Baumbach, and features Ben Stiller, Chris Rock, David Schwimmer, Jada Pinkett Smith, Sacha Baron Cohen, Cedric the Entertainer, Andy Richter, McGrath, Chris Miller, Christopher Knights, and Vernon reprising their voice acting roles from the previous installments, alongside new cast members Jessica Chastain, Bryan Cranston, Martin Short, and Frances McDormand. In the film, the main characters—a party of animals from the Central Park Zoo whose adventures have already taken them to Madagascar and Africa—attempt to return to New York City, and find themselves traveling across Europe with a circus while being chased by a relentless French Animal Control officer.

The sequel was announced in August 2008, three months before the release of the second film. The amount of animation and visual effects were done at DreamWorks Dedicated Unit, an India-based unit at Technicolor. As with other films in the franchise, Madagascar 3: Europe's Most Wanted features several songs from most artists, with musical score being composed by Hans Zimmer.

Madagascar 3: Europe's Most Wanted premiered at the 2012 Cannes Film Festival on May 18, and was theatrically released in the United States on June 8, 2012. It was the eighth highest-grossing film of 2012 and the highest-grossing film in the franchise, with a worldwide gross of over $746 million. A spin-off titled Penguins of Madagascar was released in November 2014. A sequel, Madagascar 4, was initially planned for a 2018 theatrical release, but was removed from the release schedule following a restructuring of DreamWorks Animation in 2015.

Plot
Shortly after becoming the co-leaders, the penguins and the chimpanzees leave Africa for Monte Carlo in their modified airplane. When they do not return, Alex, Marty, Melman, Gloria, King Julien, Maurice and Mort decide that they should go find them and return to their home at the Central Park Zoo in New York City. They find the penguins and chimpanzees at the Monte Carlo Casino. Chaos ensues, and the animals escape from Captain Chantel DuBois, the head of Monaco's Animal Control, who is determined to add Alex's head to her taxidermy collection.

When their aircraft crash-lands in France, the animals board a departing circus train. The circus animals—a sea lion named Stefano, a jaguar named Gia, and a tiger named Vitaly—are suspicious of outsiders, so Alex lies about them being American circus animals. The circus is headed for a performance show in Rome, followed by one in London where they hope to impress an American promoter in order to get their first American tour. To allay suspicion, the penguins purchase the circus from its human ringmaster with the fortune they gained in Monte Carlo. In Rome, Alex becomes enamored with Gia while Julien falls in love with performing bear Sonya. DuBois chases Julien and Sonya, but fails to catch them and is arrested for stealing the motor scooter.

The performance at the Colosseum in Rome is a disaster: the animals' acts go awry and they are chased off by the angry audience, though they escape on the train. Stefano explains to Alex that the circus was once famous and Vitaly was its star, skillfully jumping through ever-smaller hoops. However, a severe burn during one of Vitaly's stunts caused him to lose his passion and the entire circus suffered as a result. Alex convinces the circus animals to come up with a new and exciting all-animal act that will restore their former glory. Marty and Stefano find a new passion in being shot out of a cannon, while Melman and Gloria become adept at dancing together on a tightrope. Gia persuades Alex to teach her "Trapeze Americano" and the two begin to fall in love. Meanwhile, DuBois escapes from prison from printing a document photo of Alex performing at the Central Park Zoo and recruits her henchmen who were injured at the chase in Monte Carlo.

In London, Vitaly is afraid of failing again and considers ditching the show, but Alex helps him rediscover his passion for performing the impossible. At Alex's suggestion, Vitaly lubricates himself with hair conditioner instead of olive oil, and succeeds in jumping through the hoop. The show is a spectacular success, and the promoter signs the circus to a contract. DuBois shows up and the penguins manage to foil her attempt to capture Alex. However, the printed document she was carrying reveals that Alex, Marty, Melman, and Gloria were zoo animals all along. Feeling betrayed and deceived, the circus animals eject the foursome.

After the argument with Julien and Sonya, the zoo and circus animals go their separate ways but arrive in Central Park at the same time. Looking in at their old home, the zoo animals realize how much their adventures have changed them and decide that their true place is with the circus. They are then ambushed by DuBois, but before she can behead Alex, the zoo staff arrive and incorrectly believe that she is returning the missing animals. Julien makes it back to the circus with the news and reconciles with Sonya while Gia and Vitaly convince the others that they should rescue their friends. The zoo animals awaken in their old enclosures, now surrounded by high fences. DuBois is being honored by the zoo staff, but she rejects their reward and secretly loads a poison-filled dart and takes aim at Alex. They are soon saved by the circus animals and together defeat DuBois. Alex and his friends permanently join the circus with Alex and Julien starting a romantic relationship with Gia and Sonya, respectively. As retribution for causing their troubles, the penguins ship DuBois and her henchmen in crates to Madagascar, reminiscent of how the animals were shipped in.

Voice cast

Ben Stiller as Alex, a lion.
Chris Rock as Marty, a plains zebra and Alex's best friend.
David Schwimmer as Melman, a reticulated giraffe, another of Alex's friends.
Jada Pinkett Smith as Gloria, a hippopotamus, another of Alex's friends and Melman's love interest.
Sacha Baron Cohen as King Julien XIII, a ring-tailed lemur who is the king of the lemurs in Madagascar.
Cedric the Entertainer as Maurice, an aye-aye and adviser of King Julien XIII.
Andy Richter as Mort, a Goodman's mouse lemur and a companion of King Julien XIII.
Tom McGrath as Skipper, a penguin who is the leader of a group of four penguins, and First Policeman.
Frances McDormand as Captain Chantel DuBois, the leader of the Animal Control who plans to get Alex so she can add his head to her taxidermy collection.
Jessica Chastain as Gia, an Italian jaguar and Alex's love interest.
Martin Short as Stefano, an Italian sea lion.
Bryan Cranston as Vitaly, a Russian Siberian tiger and a ex-superstar of the travelling circus.
Chris Miller as Kowalski, a penguin and Skipper's right-hand man.
Christopher Knights as Private, a penguin.
John DiMaggio as Rico, a penguin who only communicates in grunts.
Frank Welker as Sonya, a Eurasian brown bear and King Julien's love interest.
Paz Vega as the Andalusian Triplets (Esmeralda, Esperanza and Ernestina)
Conrad Vernon as Mason, a chimpanzee and Second Policeman
Vinnie Jones as Freddie the Dog
Steve Jones as Jonesy the Dog
Nick Fletcher as Frankie the Dog
Eric Darnell as Comandante, Zoo Official and Zoo Announcer
Dan O'Connor as Casino Security and Mayor of New York City
Danny Jacobs as Croupier and Circus Master

Production
DreamWorks Animation's CEO Jeffrey Katzenberg confirmed in 2008 that there would be an additional sequel to Madagascar and Madagascar: Escape 2 Africa. Katzenberg stated, "There is at least one more chapter. We ultimately want to see the characters make it back to New York." At the Television Critics Association press tour in January 2009, Katzenberg was asked if there would be a third film in the series. He replied, "Yes, we are making a Madagascar 3 now, and it will be out in the summer of 2012." On August 9, 2010, Katzenberg revealed in an e-mail that writer-director Noah Baumbach had done sixty pages of re-writes to the screenplay.

A significant amount of the animation and visual effects for the film had been done at DreamWorks Dedicated Unit, an India-based unit at Technicolor.

Release
Madagascar 3: Europe's Most Wanted opened the Cannes Film Festival on May 18, 2012. The American release followed on June 8, 2012. The film was also converted to the IMAX format and shown in specific European territories, including Russia, Ukraine, and Poland.

Home media
Madagascar 3: Europe's Most Wanted was released on DVD, Blu-ray, and Blu-ray 3D on October 16, 2012. It was the first DreamWorks Animation film to use the UltraViolet System and the Blu-ray and Blu-ray 3D comes with a rainbow wig. As of April 2014, 9.1 million home entertainment units were sold worldwide.

Reception

Box office
Madagascar 3: Europe's Most Wanted earned $216,391,482 in North America and $530,529,792 in other countries for a worldwide total of $746,921,274. Its worldwide opening weekend totaled $137.6 million. Worldwide, it is the highest-grossing film in the series, the fourth-highest-grossing DreamWorks Animation film, the second-highest-grossing animated film of 2012, and the eighth-highest-grossing film of that year. Overall, it is the eleventh-highest-grossing animated film and the 113th-highest-grossing film of all time. The film took between 66 and 94 days of release, respectively, to out-gross its two predecessors. It surpassed Kung Fu Panda 2 to become DreamWorks' highest-grossing non-Shrek film, and the first non-Shrek film to reach over $700 million.

In North America, the film made $20.7 million on its opening day, which was higher than the opening-day grosses of the original film ($13.9 million) and its sequel ($17.6 million). For its opening weekend, the film ranked at the no. 1 spot, beating Prometheus, with $60.3 million, which was higher than the opening of the original Madagascar ($47.2 million) but was behind the opening weekend of Escape 2 Africa ($63.1 million). It remained at the top spot for two consecutive weekends. In North America, it is the highest-grossing film in the series, the sixth-highest-grossing DreamWorks Animation film, the second-highest-grossing 2012 animated film, and the tenth-highest-grossing film of 2012.

Outside North America, Europe's Most Wanted out-grossed Shrek Forever After to become DreamWorks Animation's highest-grossing film. On its opening weekend, it topped the box office with $77.3 million from 28 countries. It held that position for three consecutive weekends. Its three highest-grossing openings occurred in Russia and the CIS ($15.7 million), China ($10.4 million), and Brazil ($10.1 million in 5 days). It set an opening-day record for animated films in Russia with $3.7 million (since surpassed by Ice Age: Continental Drift) and became the highest-grossing animated film (surpassed by Ice Age: Continental Drift) and the third-highest-grossing film ever (at the time), earning $49.4 million. It also set an opening-weekend record for any film in Argentina with $3.80 million (first surpassed by Ice Age: Continental Drift) and it set opening-weekend records for animated films in Brazil, Venezuela, Trinidad, and the United Arab Emirates. Also, Madagascar 3 made $39 million in Germany, $34 million in United Kingdom and $28 million in Italy.

Critical reception
The site's critical consensus reads: "Dazzlingly colorful and frenetic, Madagascar 3 is silly enough for young kids, but boasts enough surprising smarts to engage parents along the way." This marks the best general review consensus of the film series that has showed improving critical favor; the original film has a score of 55%, and the sequel scores 64%. On Metacritic, it holds a score of 60 out of 100 based on 26 reviews, indicating "mixed or average reviews". Audiences polled by CinemaScore gave the film an average grade of "A" on an A+ to F scale.

Lisa Kennedy of The Denver Post gave the film 3.5 out of 4 stars and said, "From time to time the improbable occurs: A sequel outdoes its original." Colin Covert of Star Tribune said that Madagascar 3 set a high standard for cartoon comedy and was almost too good for kids. He gave it 3.5 out of 4 stars. Giving the film 3.5 out of 5 stars, Betsy Sharkey of the Los Angeles Times said, "A neon-saturated, high-flying trapeze act with enough frenetic funny business that it's a wonder the folks behind this zillion-dollar franchise about zoo critters on the lam didn't send the animals to the circus sooner." Stephen Witty of the Newark Star-Ledger calls the movie "fun and fast family entertainment. […] the animals' jazzy circus performance, done in black-light colors and set to a Katy Perry song—may be one of the trippiest scenes in a mainstream kiddie movie since Dumbo saw those pink elephants." Film scholar Timothy Laurie writes that the plot development of Madagascar 3 is "met with large servings of personal growth and side dishes of overcooked romance".

Accolades

Music

Madagascar 3: Europe's Most Wanted is the soundtrack of the film scored by Hans Zimmer and was released on June 5, 2012. "Afro Circus/I Like to Move It" peaked at 7 on the ARIA Hitseekers Singles chart on the week commencing October 15, 2012.

In some variations of the soundtrack, "Cool Jerk" is featured in replacement of "We No Speak Americano". "Sexy and I Know It" by LMFAO was only used in the theatrical trailer, and not included on the soundtrack and was replaced by "Firework" for the circus. "Any Way You Want It" by Journey and the instrumental "Watermark" from the album of the same name by Enya were also used, but are not included on the soundtrack. "Land of Hope and Glory" by Edward Elgar appears in the track "Fur Power".  The "Afro Circus" tune is from "Entrance of the Gladiators", by the Czech composer Julius Fučík.

Video games
A video game based on the film, Madagascar 3: The Video Game, was released on June 5, 2012. The game allows gamers to play as Alex, Marty, Melman, and Gloria as they travel across Europe promoting the circus by performing stunts, circus acts and completing missions. It was released to PlayStation 3, Xbox 360, Wii, Nintendo 3DS, and Nintendo DS. Published by D3 Publisher, the Wii, Xbox 360, and PlayStation 3 versions were developed by Monkey Bar Games, and the 3DS and DS versions by Torus Games. The game received negative reviews from critics with Metacritic giving the Xbox 360 version a 45/100.

A mobile video game, Madagascar: Join the Circus!, also published by D3 Publisher, was released on June 4, 2012, for iPhone and iPad. The game allows players to build a circus and play mini-games. The game was removed from App Stores on June 16, 2017.

Comic book
A comic book based on the film and titled Madagascar Digest Prequel: Long Live the King! was released on June 12, 2012, by Ape Entertainment.

Future

Possible sequel
In June 2014 it was announced that Madagascar 4 would be released on May 18, 2018. However, in January 2015, the film was removed from the release schedule following a corporate restructuring of DreamWorks Animation. In April 2017, Tom McGrath stated "There are things in the works, nothing is announced yet, but I think [the characters will] show their faces once more."

Spin-off
A spin-off film titled Penguins of Madagascar, depicting the adventures of penguin characters following the events of Madagascar 3, was released on November 26, 2014.

Notes

References

External links

2012 films
2012 3D films
3D animated films
2012 animated films
2012 computer-animated films
2010s American animated films
2010s children's animated films
2010s children's comedy films
Madagascar (franchise) films
American 3D films
American children's animated comedy films
American computer-animated films
American sequel films
Animated films about animals
Animated films about apes
Animated films about lions
Animated films about penguins
Circus films
Films about tigers
Animated films set in France
Animated films set in London
Films set in Monaco
Animated films set in Manhattan
Films set in Rome
Films set in Switzerland
Films set in Vatican City
Films set in zoos
Animated films about trains
DreamWorks Animation animated films
IMAX films
Paramount Pictures films
Paramount Pictures animated films
Films directed by Eric Darnell
Films directed by Conrad Vernon
Films directed by Tom McGrath
Films scored by Hans Zimmer
2012 comedy films
CJ Entertainment films
2010s English-language films